Douglas Herbert Rayment (13 December 1910 – 23 April 1978) was an Australian rules footballer who played with St Kilda in the Victorian Football League (VFL). He also played for Victorian Football Association club Prahran, crossing without a clearance in 1941 during the throw-pass era.

Rayment later served in the Royal Australian Air Force during World War II.

Notes

External links 

Doug Rayment's profile at Australianfootball.com

1910 births
1978 deaths
Australian rules footballers from Melbourne
St Kilda Football Club players
Sandringham Football Club players
Prahran Football Club players
People from Carlton, Victoria
Royal Australian Air Force personnel of World War II
Military personnel from Melbourne